The 1967–68 Challenge Cup was the 67th staging of rugby league's oldest knockout competition, the Challenge Cup. The final was contested by Leeds and Wakefield Trinity at Wembley, with Leeds winning 11–10.

First round
All 30 professional clubs entered the first round of the Challenge Cup, plus two amateur teams – Hull BOCM, and Leigh Miners. Matches took place on 2–4 February 1968. The match between Workington Town and Whitehaven was postponed until 7 February due to the weather.

Second round
Matches in the second round were played on 25 February 1968. One game also went to a replay, which took place on 28 February 1968.

Third round
Matches in the third round were played on 16–17 March 1968.

Semi final

Replay

Final

References

External links
Pathe News coverage of the Rugby Cup Final 1968
Challenge Cup official website 
Challenge Cup 1967/68 results at Rugby League Project

Challenge Cup
Challenge Cup